Senator Schaefer may refer to:

Daniel Schaefer (1936–2006), Colorado State Senate
Kurt Schaefer (born 1965), Missouri State Senate
Michael P. Schaefer (1938–2013), Pennsylvania State Senate
Nancy Schaefer (1936–2010), Georgia State Senate

See also
Senator Schaffer (disambiguation)
Senator Shafer (disambiguation)
Senator Shaffer (disambiguation)